The following is a list of transfers for the 2011 Major League Soccer season.  The Portland Timbers made their first moves by signing Steve Cronin, Bright Dike, Eddie Johnson, and Ryan Pore.  Another expansion side, Vancouver Whitecaps FC made their first signing on November 18, 2010, acquiring Jay DeMerit through the league's allocation process.  On November 24, 2010, the Timbers and the Whitecaps selected 10 unprotected players in the 2010 MLS Expansion Draft.  The rest of the moves will be made from the 2010-2011 off-season all the way through the 2011 season.

Transfers 

1 Player moved when his contract expired on 1 January 2011.
2 Player was never signed, only rights to player were acquired.

References

External links 
 Official Site of Major League Soccer

2011

Major League Soccer
Major League Soccer